The Boland Amendment is a term describing three U.S. legislative amendments between 1982 and 1984, all aimed at limiting U.S. government assistance to the Contras in Nicaragua. The first Boland Amendment was part of the House Appropriations Bill of 1982, which was attached as a rider to the Defense Appropriations Act of 1983, named for the Massachusetts Democrat, Representative Edward Boland, who authored it. The House of Representatives passed the Defense Appropriations Act 411–0 on December 8, 1982, and it was signed by President Ronald Reagan on December 21, 1982. The amendment outlawed U.S. assistance to the Contras for the purpose of overthrowing the Nicaraguan government, while allowing assistance for other purposes.

Beyond restricting overt U.S. support of the Contras, the most significant effect of the Boland Amendment was the Iran–Contra affair, during which the Reagan Administration circumvented the Amendment in order to continue supplying arms to the Contras.

Background
During the early years of the Reagan administration, a civil war raged in Nicaragua, pitting the revolutionary Sandinista government against Contra rebel groups. After the CIA carried out a series of acts of sabotage without Congressional intelligence committees being made aware beforehand, the Boland Amendment was passed by Congress, cutting off appropriated funding for the Contras. Prior to its passage, an earlier amendment proposed by Tom Harkin that would have disallowed all funding for Contra efforts had failed to pass.

The Boland Amendment, proposed by Edward Boland, was a compromise because the Democrats did not have enough votes for a comprehensive ban. The Amendment gained traction due to widespread opposition among the American public to funding the Contras: pollster Holly Sklar pegs public opposition to Contra funding at the time of Reagan's re-election at a consistent "trend of two to one." It covered only appropriated funds spent by intelligence agencies (such as the CIA). Some of Reagan's national security officials used non-appropriated money spent by the National Security Council (NSC) to circumvent the Amendment. No court ever made a determination whether the Amendment covered the NSC and, because the law was a prohibition rather than a criminal statute, no one could be indicted for violating it. Opponents alleged that the White House violated the Amendment. Congress later resumed aid to the Contras, totaling over $300 million. The Sandinistas were voted out of power in 1990, and voted back in 16 years later in 2006.

The Boland Amendment prohibited the federal government from providing military support "for the purpose of overthrowing the Government of Nicaragua." It aimed to prevent CIA funding of rebels opposed to the revolutionary provisional junta. The Amendment sought to block Reagan administration support for the Contra rebels. The amendment was narrowly interpreted by the Reagan administration to apply to only U.S. intelligence agencies, allowing the National Security Council (NSC), which is not labeled an intelligence agency, to channel funds to the Contra rebels. To block the funding through the NSC, the amendment was changed to prohibit any funds for military or paramilitary operations.

Administration officials argued that the Boland Amendment, or any act of Congress, could not interfere with the president's conduct of foreign policy by restricting funds, as the president could seek funds from private entities or foreign governments. In this spirit, and despite the Boland Amendment, Vice Admiral John M. Poindexter, USN, and his deputy, Lieutenant Colonel Oliver North, USMC, secretly diverted to the Nicaraguan contras millions of dollars in funds received from a secret deal that some alleged had explicit presidential approvalthe sales of anti-tank and anti-aircraft missiles to Iran in spite of Reagan's public pledge not to deal with terrorists. In November 1986, a pro-Syrian newspaper in Lebanon revealed the secret deal to the world. This came as Democrats won back control of the Senate in the 1986 elections. In public hearings of a joint House–Senate committee convened for purposes of investigating the affair, Democrats sought to prosecute North for his role. The final report published after the hearings blamed Reagan's passive style of leadership for allowing the conduct of foreign policy without involvement of any elected official. Elections in Nicaragua subsequently ousted the Sandinistas from power; later elections brought them back into power.

Legislature chronology
A chronology from John Negroponte.

In December 1982 H.J.RES.631 became public law 97-377 making further continuing appropriations for the fiscal year 1983. The amendment S.UP.AMDT.1542 by Senator Daniel Patrick Moynihan, which aimed to prohibit the use of funds by the CIA or DOD to support military activities in Nicaragua, fell. Amendment S.UP.AMDT.1541 by Senator Christopher J. Dodd "to declare Congressional support for restrictions on certain types of operations in Central America" was tabled.

But H.R.7355 made appropriations for the Department of Defense and amendment H.AMDT.974 to it by Representative Edward P. Boland passed with a recorded vote of 411–0 to prohibit the CIA or Defense Department to use the funds of the bill for military purposes in Nicaragua.

In December 1983, for the fiscal year 1984, H.R.4185, sponsored by Representative Joseph P. Addabbo, which became public law 98-212, and H.R.2968, sponsored by Boland, which became public law 98-215 limited the amount to be spent for military purposes in Nicaragua. Amendment H.AMDT.461 by Boland to H.R. 2968 prohibited covert assistance for military operations in Nicaragua.

In December 1984, for fiscal year 1985, H.J.RES.648, became public law 98-473, and prohibited funds available to the CIA and the DOD from being used in Nicaragua for military purposes.

In December 1985, for fiscal year 1986, S.960 became public law 99-83 and also excluded military use for funds to be spent in Nicaragua.

Congressional Research Service
"In 1984, controversy over U.S. assistance to the opponents of the Nicaraguan government (the anti-Sandinista guerrillas known as the “contras”) led to a prohibition on such assistance in a continuing appropriations bill. This legislative ban is summarized below.

The continuing appropriations resolution for FY1985, P.L. 98-473, 98 Stat. 1935–1937, signed October 12, 1984, provided that: "During fiscal year 1985, no funds available to the Central Intelligence Agency, the Department of Defense, or any other agency or entity of the United States involved in intelligence activities may be obligated or expended for the purpose or which would have the effect of supporting, directly or indirectly, military or paramilitary operations in Nicaragua by any nation, group, organization, movement or individual." This legislation also provided that after February 28, 1985, if the President made a report to Congress specifying certain criteria, including the need to provide further assistance for "military or paramilitary operations" prohibited by this statute, he could expend $14 million in funds if Congress passed a joint resolution approving such action."

See also
 Iran–Contra affair
 Clark Amendment
 Nicaragua v. United States

References

External links
  Thomas'  summary for HR 2968 in the 98th Congress
 Government Accountability Office report B-201260
 Iran-Contra Hearings; Boland Amendments: What They Provided. New York Times

Nicaraguan Revolution
Iran–Contra affair
United States federal defense and national security legislation
Nicaragua–United States relations